Jarrod Alonge (born March 25, 1993) is an American comedian, songwriter and music producer. He is best known for his parodies of the artists, sub-genres and stereotypes within alternative music. He has released three independent full-length studio albums, Beating a Dead Horse, Friendville and Awkward & Depressed, all of which reached number one on the Billboard Top Comedy Albums chart. Alonge is the owner and founder of Boketo Media, a digital media and production company which launched in March 2019. He is also the lead songwriter and guitarist of post-hardcore project CrazyEightyEight.

Personal life 
Alonge studied biology at Tennessee Technological University and graduated with a BS degree in 2014, having originally planned to attend medical school. He is a self-described Star Wars fanatic, making multiple references to the franchise in his content. He currently lives in Chattanooga, Tennessee with his wife Rachel.

Discography

Studio albums

with CrazyEightyEight
 Burning Alive (2018)

Extended plays

Music videos

Singles and demos 
 "I'm So Scene" (2013)
 "Eternity (Literally)" (2014)
 "Pop Punk Pizza Party" (2014)
 "12 Days of a Pop Punk Christmas" (2015)
 "Pubic Apology" (2016)

Awards and nominations 

|-
| 2014 || Jarrod Alonge || Kerrang! Awards – Best Comedian ||

References 

1993 births
Living people
21st-century American comedians
Comedy-related YouTube channels
Comedy YouTubers
American comedy musicians